Daniil Vyacheslavovich Maykov (born 14 April 1997) is a Russian football player.

Career

Zenit
Maykov joined Zenit academy in 2012 from Lokomotiv Saint Petersburg. He made his debut in the Russian Football National League for FC Zenit-2 Saint Petersburg on 21 May 2016 in a game against FC Torpedo Armavir.

Slavia Sofia
Maykov joined Slavia Sofia on trial in January 2017. On 17 February 2017, he signed a contract. Maykov made his league debut on 5 March in a 3–0 home loss against Neftochimic Burgas.  He was set to be released by the new manager in the beginning of June 2017, but returned in the team for second summer camp of the team. On 11 July 2017, his contract was terminated by mutual consent.

Career statistics

Club

References

External links
 Profile by Russian Football National League
 

1997 births
Footballers from Saint Petersburg
Living people
Russian footballers
FC Zenit-2 Saint Petersburg players
First Professional Football League (Bulgaria) players
PFC Slavia Sofia players
Russian expatriate footballers
Russian expatriate sportspeople in Bulgaria
Expatriate footballers in Bulgaria
Association football defenders